Jan Čejvan (born 14 June 1976) is a Slovene former competitive figure skater. He is the 1993–2000 national champion and competed in the final segment at three ISU Championships – the 1995 World Junior Championships in Budapest, Hungary; the 1996 European Championships in Sofia, Bulgaria; and the 1999 European Championships in Prague, Czech Republic. He has worked as an ISU technical specialist for Slovenia and the coach of Daša Grm.

Programs

Results
GP: Grand Prix

References

External links

1976 births
Slovenian male single skaters
Living people
International Skating Union technical specialists
Sportspeople from Ljubljana
Competitors at the 2003 Winter Universiade